The 50th Guldbagge Awards ceremony, presented by the Swedish Film Institute, honoring the best Swedish films of 2014, took place on 26 January 2015. The ceremony was televised by SVT and hosted, for the third time by comedian Petra Mede.

Winners and nominees 
The nominees for the 50th Guldbagge Awards were announced on 8 January 2015 in Stockholm, by the Swedish Film Institute.

Awards 

Winners are listed first and highlighted in boldface.

Multiple nominations and awards 

The following films received one or multiple nominations:
 Thirteen: Gentlemen
 Ten: Force Majeure
 Seven: A Pigeon Sat on a Branch Reflecting on Existence
 Three: The Quiet Roar and Tjuvarnas jul – Trollkarlens dotter
 Two: Something Must Break and Flugparken
 One: My So-Called Father, Hemma, Apt. + Car + All I Have and Own, Concerning Violence and Ute på landet

The following four films received multiple awards:
 TBA

References

External links
Official website
Guldbaggen on Facebook
Guldbaggen on Twitter
50th Guldbagge Awards at Internet Movie Database

2015 in Swedish cinema
2014 film awards
Guldbagge Awards ceremonies
2010s in Stockholm
January 2015 events in Europe